Klovainiai is a town in the Pakruojis district municipality in north central Lithuania. According to the 2011 census, it had population of 785.

References

Towns in Šiauliai County
Ponevezhsky Uyezd
Pakruojis District Municipality